Jacob the Liar is a 1969 East German novel.

Jacob the Liar may also refer to:
Jacob the Liar (1975 film), an East German-Czechoslovakian film adaptation of the novel
Jakob the Liar, 1999 remake of the 1975 film